Maille is an archaic spelling of mail (armour).

Maille also may refer to:
 Maille (company), seasoning company
 Maillé (disambiguation), any of several French villages